This was a parliamentary by-election for the British House of Commons constituency of Leith

Previous MP 
When David Lloyd George replaced H. H. Asquith as Liberal Party Leader, the Liberal MP, William Wedgwood Benn decided to resign from the Liberal party and to join the Labour Party. Benn believed that his change of party allegiances warranted him resigning his seat and seeking re-election.

Previous result

Candidates 
Benn had been the Liberal MP for Leith since 1918 and was keen to stand for election as a Labour candidate. However, the Leith Labour Party did not want him as their candidate, so Benn did not contest the by-election.
The Leith Labour Party adopted R.F. Wilson as their candidate. He was a local left-wing Socialist who had stood against Benn in the previous two elections. 
The Conservatives, who had not contested the seat since 1918, put up a candidate in Allan Beaton. He was one of the Scottish conservatives most experienced candidates. He had contested the safe Labour seat of Edinburgh Central at the last General Election.
The Leith Liberal Association struggled to find a Liberal candidate prepared to defend a seat under such difficult circumstances. However, their seventh choice as candidate, Ernest Brown agreed to contest the seat. Brown was an Englishman who was employed by party headquarters as a speaker. He had briefly been Liberal MP for Rugby from 1923-24 when he was defeated.

Campaign
The Liberal campaign was reliant upon Brown's ability and enthusiasm as a speaker, backed by plentiful funds from Lloyd George's national organisation. However, his task was made difficult because the local Liberal organisation had been allowed to run down during Benn's tenure as MP.

Result 
Right up to polling day, the newspapers were predicting either a Labour win or a Conservative win with much talk about the prospect of the Liberal losing his deposit.

Aftermath 
Four days after this victory, the Liberals gained a seat from Labour at Southwark North.
Benn did not have long to wait for a local Labour Party to adopt him as a candidate when a by-election vacancy came at Aberdeen North in 1928, where he was returned to parliament. 
At the 1929 general election Brown was re-elected here. Beaton contested Dunfermline Burghs without success and Wilson did not stand again.

References

 British Parliamentary Election Results 1918-1949, compiled and edited by F.W.S. Craig (The Macmillan Press 1979)

1927 elections in the United Kingdom
1927 in Scotland
1920s elections in Scotland
By-elections to the Parliament of the United Kingdom in Edinburgh constituencies
History of Leith